Alan Charles Thorpe (25 May 1901 – 16 December 1955) was a rugby union player who represented Australia.

Thorpe, was born in Sydney and claimed 1 international rugby cap for Australia. He attended Newington College in 1914 and 1915.

References

1901 births
1955 deaths
Australian rugby union players
Australia international rugby union players
People educated at Newington College
Rugby union players from Sydney
Rugby union centres